John Mumford (12 April 1918 – 16 July 1999) was an Australian athlete who competed in the 1938 British Empire Games. At the 1938 Empire Games he won the silver medal in the 100 yards event as well as in the 220 yards competition. In the 440 yards contest he finished fourth.

External links
 John Mumford at Australian Athletics Historical Results
 John Mumford at trackfield.brinkster.net

1918 births
1999 deaths
Athletes (track and field) at the 1938 British Empire Games
Australian male sprinters
Commonwealth Games medallists in athletics
Commonwealth Games silver medallists for Australia
Medallists at the 1938 British Empire Games